Messin' is a rock album released in 1973 by Manfred Mann's Earth Band.

Messin followed Glorified Magnified and preceded Solar Fire, and like all Earth Band albums contains a mixture of originals and covers (see track listing below).

"Buddah" also appeared on the Vertigo budget sampler double album Suck It and See, along with tracks by then-labelmates Kraftwerk, Jade Warrior and the Sensational Alex Harvey Band, amongst others.

The album was produced by Manfred Mann and engineered by John Edwards at Maximum Sound Studios, London in 1973.

For the United States release, the album was re-titled Get Your Rocks Off''''' and the track "Pretty Good" was included in place of "Black and Blue", seemingly because the latter was about slavery and deemed unsuitable for the US market. Both tracks were included on the 1998 re-mastered re-issue. Under this title, the album just barely made the US Billboard 200, spending only two weeks on the charts and peaking at number 196 on June 30, 1973.

UK track listing

''Messin''' 
Side one
 "Messin (Mike Hugg) – 9:54
 "Buddah" (Manfred Mann, Mick Rogers) – 7:01
 "Cloudy Eyes" (Mann) – 5:32
Side two
 "Get Your Rocks Off" (Bob Dylan) – 2:51
 "Sadjoy" (Mann) – 5:20
 "Black and Blue" (Chain: Barry Sullivan, Matt Taylor, Phil Manning, Barry Harvey) – 7:21  (6:44 on the 1998 re-issue)
 "Mardi Gras Day" (Dr John Creaux) – 3:02
Bonus Tracks (1998 re-issue)
 "Pretty Good" (John Prine) – 4:11
 "Cloudy Eyes" (single edit) (Mann) – 3:31

US track listing

Get Your Rocks Off 
Side one
"Messin'" (Mike Hugg) – 10:00
"Pretty Good" (John Prine) – 4:00
"Sadjoy" (Manfred Mann) – 4:30
Side two
 "Get Your Rocks Off" (Bob Dylan) – 3:00
"Buddah" (Mann, Mick Rogers) – 7:00
"Cloudy Eyes" (Mann) – 5:30
"Mardi Gras Day" (Dr John Creaux) – 3:00

Personnel 
The Earth Band
 Manfred Mann – organ, Minimoog synthesiser
 Mick Rogers – electric guitar, lead vocals
 Colin Pattenden – bass guitar
 Chris Slade – drums
Additional musicians
 Laurie Baker – Machines and Zoo on "Messin' "
 Liza Strike – backing vocals
 Vicki Brown – backing vocals
 Judith Powell – backing vocals
 Ruby James – backing vocals
Technical
 Manfred Mann – producer
 John Edwards – engineer
 Laurence Latham – engineer ("Sadjoy")
 Peter Hignett – sleeve concept
 Peter Goodfellow – illustration

Sources

External links
 
 
 Manfred Mann's Earth Band - ''Messin''' (1973) album credits & user reviews at ProgArchives.com
 Manfred Mann's Earth Band - ''Messin''' (1973) album to be listened on Spotify

Manfred Mann's Earth Band albums
1973 albums
Vertigo Records albums
Polydor Records albums
Bronze Records albums